Cranmer Park is a Denver city park located in the Hilltop neighborhood off of Colorado Boulevard between East 1st and East 3rd Avenue. It is most famous for a large sundial, which does double duty as a climbing appliance for children.

An inscription at the base describes the axis of the gnomon as elevated 39°43' in the direction of polar north. The stone is perpendicular to the gnomon at 50°17', which makes it parallel to the equator. The south side of the stone is similarly marked for wintertime observation.

A polar chart at the base of the sundial describes the zodiac and degrees of the sun's position, and how to set a clock based on the gnomon's shadow. For winter viewing, the chart continues on the south side of the stone.

History of the sundial
The current sundial is the second one to exist at this location in the park. The first was donated in 1941 by longtime Manager of Denver Parks George E. Cranmer, for whom the park is named. It was destroyed by vandals who exploded dynamite under it in September 1965. The replacement sundial was installed in March, 1966 after a successful citywide fundraising effort led by the Denver Junior Chamber of Commerce.

References

External links
Save Our Sundial

Sundials
Astronomical instruments
Parks in Denver
National Register of Historic Places in Denver
Parks on the National Register of Historic Places in Colorado